ASGC (Al Shafar General Contracting Co. LLC) Construction is a construction conglomerate company established in 1989, headquartered in Dubai, UAE. ASGC is one of 26 companies in the Al Shafar Group. In 2020, the company had annual revenues of $1bn and 17,000 employees. It is privately owned by Mohamed Saif Bin Shafar (chairman), Emad Azmy (vice-chairman) and Mohammed Al Sayyah (non-executive director).

History
The business was established in 1989 by a Dubai national and an Egyptian engineer.

In 2005, projects constructed by ASGC include Dubai's Ministry of Public Works building, the Dubai Police headquarters, Sector 6 of Jumeirah Beach Residence, Al Shatha Tower, and the 67-floor Mohammad Saif Al Shafar residential tower. In 2010, it reported project wins in Abu Dhabi, Dubai and Egypt worth around AED3 billion.

In 2015, it delayed plans for an initial public offering of its shares. Its completed projects then included the Waldorf Astoria on Palm Jumeirah.

In 2016, ASGC, in a joint venture with Kier, was awarded the Bluewaters Island project by Meraas to build more than 700 apartments. In 2019, it was appointed by Meraas to build a cruise liner terminal nearby, between Palm Jumeira and Bluewaters Island.

In 2016, ASGC started construction of Dubai's $245m (AED900m) Mohammed Bin Rashid Library, reputedly the largest cultural and library project in the Arab world, and won contracts to upgrade concourses at Dubai International Airport.

In May 2020, it became the largest shareholder (with a 15% shareholding) in the United Kingdom's Costain Group, as part of Costain's £100 million cash-raising share issue.

In 2020, ASGC contributed to Dubai's efforts to combat the COVID-19 pandemic, during which it was forced to cut around 15% of its workforce (almost 2,300 employees). In Egypt, the firm donated EGP5m to a COVID-19 fund to support seasonal workers.

Clients
ASGC Construction has worked with various government, public and private organizations. Its government clients have included Expo 2020, Dubai's Roads and Transport Authority, SEHA, ADNOC, Dubai Police, DAEP, Dubai World Trade Centre and New Urban Communities Authority.

Awards
Contractor of the Year - Better Together Awards Expo 2020
Dubai Chamber CSR Label 2020
Mohamed Bin Rashid Al Maktoum Business Excellence and Business Innovation Awards 2019
Contractor of the Year and Excellence in BIM - both in Big Project Awards 2019
Contractor of the Year - Big Project Awards 2018
Contractor of the Year - MEED 2018

References 

Companies based in Dubai
Privately held companies of the United Arab Emirates
Conglomerate companies of the United Arab Emirates